Kate O'Toole may refer to:
Kate O'Toole (radio presenter), Australian radio presenter
Kate O'Toole (actress) (born 1960), Irish actress